Adolph Biermann (November 19, 1842 – January 5, 1914) was an American farmer and politician.

Biography
Born in Christiana, Norway, Biermann emigrated to the United States in 1862. He first settled in Milwaukee, Wisconsin and served in the 24th Wisconsin Volunteer Infantry Regiment, during the American Civil War, until 1865. He was involved in the Battle of Perryville and Battle of Stones River. In 1866, he moved to Rochester, Minnesota, worked as a bookkeeper and settled on a farm. In 1874, Biermann was elected Auditor of Olmsted County, Minnesota. Biermann ran for Governor of Minnesota in 1883, receiving about 43% of the vote. He also ran for Minnesota Secretary of State, and the United States House of Representatives as a Democrat losing the elections. In 1885, President Grover Cleveland appointed Biermann the United States Collector of Internal Revenue for Minnesota. From 1891 to 1895, Biermann served as Minnesota State Auditor. He died in Rochester, Minnesota, of a stroke.

References

1842 births
1914 deaths
Norwegian emigrants to the United States
Politicians from Rochester, Minnesota
Politicians from Milwaukee
People of Wisconsin in the American Civil War
Businesspeople from Minnesota
Farmers from Minnesota
Minnesota Democrats
County officials in Minnesota
State Auditors of Minnesota
19th-century American politicians